Alan Keef Ltd is a British narrow gauge railway engineering company which manufactures, overhauls, and deals in narrow gauge locomotives, rolling stock and associated equipment.

History
The limited company was formed in 1975 at Cote, Bampton, Oxfordshire, continuing what Alan Keef had already been doing for some years as an individual. The first new locomotive was built in 1976. 

In 1986 the company moved to larger premises at Lea, near Ross-on-Wye in Herefordshire. In 1987 it took over the production of Motor Rail locomotives.

Production
, the company had built more than eighty locomotives – steam, diesel and electric. Most have been miniature or narrow gauge except for two standard gauge steam locomotives for Beamish Museum: the replicas of "Steam Elephant" and "Puffing Billy". In 2008 the company built the frames, running gear and mechanical parts for two Parry People Mover railcars for use on the Stourbridge Town branch (139001 and 139002). A number of Alan Keef's locomotives are replicas of steam locomotives but with diesel power. These are referred to as steam outline (s/o) in the listing below.

In addition to the replicas for Beamish, the company has also helped restore a number of historically significant engines including both UK preserved Baldwin Class 10-12-D locomotives – No. 778 – which now works at Leighton Buzzard Light Railway and more recently No 794 (referred to as No 590) from the Welsh Highland Heritage Railway. However, this project was eventually paused and the WHHR moved the locomotive to the Vale of Rheidol's Aberystwyth workshops for completion in 2020.

New and rebuilt locomotives

See also
British narrow gauge railways

References

External links
 Official website

Keef Ltd
10¼ in gauge railways in the United Kingdom
2 ft gauge railways in the United Kingdom
2 ft 6 in gauge railways in the United Kingdom
3 ft gauge railways in the United Kingdom
3 ft 6 in gauge railways in the United Kingdom